Bridgewater Systems was a Canadian network management technology firm. It developed software for phone and cable companies. The firm was acquired by Amdocs in 2011.

History
Bridgewater was founded by Doug Somers and Russ Freen in 1997. From 2004 to 2007, Bridgewater's revenues grew from $13.7 million to $39 million. In 2007 Bridgewater made an initial public offering on the Toronto Stock Exchange under the stock symbol BWC, where it raised $35 million. In 2008 Bridgewater expanded its long-time relationship with Verizon Wireless by signing a three-year contract which included an initial order valued at $30 million. The April 2010 Infonetics Research report ranked Bridgewater as #1 in the 2009 policy market In 2011, Bridgewater's board unanimously approved a takeover bid from Amdocs, an American headquarter technology firm, valuing the company at $215 million.

References

External links
Official site

Companies based in Ottawa
Telecommunications companies of Canada
Telecommunications equipment vendors
Amdocs